Nouvelle Air Ivoire was an airline in Côte d'Ivoire. It was founded in 1999. In 2000, the airline merged into Air Ivoire.

See also		
 List of defunct airlines of Côte d'Ivoire

External links
Airline History

Airlines established in 1999
Airlines disestablished in 2000
Defunct airlines of Ivory Coast
1999 establishments in Ivory Coast
2000 disestablishments in Ivory Coast